In literature, the tone of a literary work expresses the writer's attitude toward or feelings about the subject matter and audience.

Overview
Depending upon the personality of the writer and the effect the writer wants to create, the work can be formal or informal, sober or whimsical, assertive or pleading, straightforward or sly.  In determining the attitude, mood, or tone of an author, one could examine the specific diction used.

When one writes, images and descriptive phrases can transmit emotions across—guarded optimism, unqualified enthusiasm, objective indifference, resignation, or dissatisfaction. Some other examples of literary tone are:  airy, comic, condescending, facetious, funny, heavy, intimate, ironic, light, modest, playful, sad, serious, sinister, solemn, somber, and threatening.

Difference from mood
Tone and mood are not the same, although they are frequently confused. The mood of a piece of literature is the feeling or atmosphere created by the work, or, said slightly differently, how the work makes the reader feel. Mood is produced most effectively through the use of setting, theme, voice and tone, while tone is how the author feels about something.

Usage
All pieces of literature, even official documents and technical documents, have some sort of tone. Authors create tone through the use of various other literary elements, such as diction or word choice; syntax, the grammatical arrangement of words in a text for effect; imagery, or vivid appeals to the senses; details, facts that are included or omitted; and figurative language, the comparison of seemingly unrelated things for sub-textual  purposes.

While now used to discuss literature, the term tone was originally applied solely to music. This appropriated word has come to represent attitudes and feelings a speaker (in poetry), a narrator (in fiction), or an author (in non-literary prose) has towards the subject, situation, and/or the intended audience. It is important to recognize that the  speaker, or narrator is not to be confused with the author and that attitudes and feelings of the  speaker or narrator should not be confused with those of the author. In general, the tone of a piece only refers to attitude of the author if writing is non-literary in nature.

In many cases, the tone of a work may change and shift as the speaker or narrator's perspective on a particular subject alters throughout the piece.

Official and technical documentation tends to employ a formal tone throughout the piece.

Setting tone

Authors set a tone in literature by conveying emotions/feelings through words. The way a person feels about an idea/concept, event, or another person can be quickly determined through facial expressions, gestures and in the tone of voice used.  In literature an author sets the tone through words.  The possible tones are bounded only by the number of possible emotions a human being can have.

Diction and syntax often dictate what the author's (or character's) attitude toward his subject is at the time. An example: "Charlie surveyed the classroom but it was really his mother congratulating himself for snatching the higher test grade, the smug smirk on his face growing brighter and brighter as he confirmed the inferiority of his peers."

The tone here is one of arrogance; the quip "inferiority of his peers" shows Charlie's belief in his own prowess. The words "surveyed" and "congratulating himself" show Charlie as seeing himself better than the rest of his class.  The diction, including the word "snatching", gives the reader a mental picture of someone quickly and effortlessly grabbing something, which proves once again Charlie's pride in himself. The "smug smirk" provides a facial imagery of Charlie's pride.

In addition, using imagery in a poem is helpful to develop a poem's tone.

See also
Grammatical voice
Point of view (literature)
Writer's voice

Notes

References
 
 
 
 
 
 
 
 

Literary concepts
Fiction
Style (fiction)